Cuckoo Wood is a 2.5 hectare Local Nature Reserve in Braintree in Essex. It is owned by Braintree District Council and managed by Essex County Council as an educational resource.

The site has amenity grassland, meadows, woods, lakes, ponds, ditches and hedgerows. It has some locally rare species, and is described by Natural England as a very good habitat for fungi, due to a large amount of dead wood.

The site is not open to the public.

References

Local Nature Reserves in Essex